Pudding Monsters is a puzzle video game developed by ZeptoLab for iOS and Android in 2012, and for Nintendo Switch in 2022.

Reception
The Switch version received "generally favorable reviews", while the iOS version received above-average reviews, according to the review aggregation website Metacritic.

References

External links
 

2012 video games
Android (operating system) games
IOS games
Nintendo Switch games
Puzzle video games
Single-player video games
Video games developed in Spain
ZeptoLab games
QubicGames games